Thomas Green  (less properly Greene)  (1658 – 18 May 1738) was an English academic and bishop.

Life
He was born in  Norwich,  and educated at Norwich School and Corpus Christi College, Cambridge, where he graduated B.A. in 1679 and became a Fellow in 1680. 
He was Master of Corpus from 1698 to 1716, clashing with Robert Moss, and Vice-chancellor of the University of Cambridge, in 1699 and 1713.

With the support of Thomas Tenison, he became chaplain to Sir Stephen Fox, and rector of Minster-in-Thanet.
He was Archdeacon of Canterbury from 1708 to 1721.

A Whig in politics, he became chaplain to George I of Great Britain, and rector of St. Martin's-in-the-Fields in 1716. In 1721 he became Bishop of Norwich, and in 1723 Bishop of Ely. As bishop of Ely, Green had visitatorial powers at Trinity College, Cambridge, and intervened from 1729 in the quarrel between Richard Bentley, who was the Master, and the Fellows. The matter dragged out and went to the House of Lords, only terminating in Green's death.

He was known as a “finical” character, a taker of snuff and sometimes called “Miss Green” for his feminine face.

References

Adaptation of Dictionary of National Biography, article Green, Thomas (1658–1738)

1658 births
1738 deaths
Bishops of Ely
Bishops of Norwich
Archdeacons of Canterbury
Alumni of Corpus Christi College, Cambridge
Masters of Corpus Christi College, Cambridge
People educated at Norwich School
Vice-Chancellors of the University of Cambridge
18th-century Church of England bishops